36 Aquilae (abbreviated 36 Aql) is a star in the equatorial constellation of Aquila. 36 Aquilae is its Flamsteed designation though it also bears the Bayer designation e Aquilae. With an apparent visual magnitude of 5.02, this star is faintly visible to the naked eye.

The spectrum of this star matches a stellar classification of M1 III. It is a red giant star with 54 times the radius of the Sun that is currently on the asymptotic giant branch. This means the star is generating energy by the fusion of hydrogen along an outer shell and helium along a concentric inner shell, surrounding an inert core of carbon and oxygen. 36 Aquilae undergoes small, periodic variations in luminosity, changing by 0.0063 magnitudes about 11.5 times per day, or once every 2 hours and 5.2 minutes.

References

External links
 HR 7414
 Image 36 Aquilae

Aquilae, e
Aquilae, 36
183630
Aquila (constellation)
095937
M-type giants
7414
BD-03 4612
Suspected variables